Timothy Twellman (born May 1, 1955) is an American former soccer player who spent seven years in the North American Soccer League and four in the Major Indoor Soccer League.  He also earned one cap with the U.S. national team in 1982.  After retiring from playing professionally, he has coached high school and youth soccer for over twenty years.  He is the father of former New England Revolution striker Taylor Twellman.

Youth
Twellman grew up in St. Louis, Missouri, attending St. Louis University High School.  After graduating from high school, he attended Southern Illinois University Edwardsville where he played on the men's soccer team from 1973 to 1976.  He is ranked ninth on the school's career scoring list with twenty-seven goals and twenty-two assists.  He also played on the school's baseball team in 1975 and 1976.

Professional
In 1977, Twellman signed with the Minnesota Kicks of the North American Soccer League (NASL). He played five seasons with them as a forward, scoring five goals in 109 games. In 1982, he began the season with the Tulsa Roughnecks. On June 13, 1982, the Roughnecks traded Twellman and John Tyma to the Chicago Sting in exchange for Tasso Koutsoukos. He finished the 1982 season with ten games for the Sting, then played sixteen games, scoring one goal as the Sting took the 1984 NASL championship.  The NASL collapsed after the 1984 season and several of the league's teams, including the Sting, jumped to the Major Indoor Soccer League.  In 1985, Twellman moved to the Kansas City Comets where he spent one season.  He retired from playing professionally after the 1985–1986 season.

National team
On March 21, 1982, Twellman earned his only cap with the U.S. national team as a defender in a 2–1 win over Trinidad and Tobago.

Post playing career
Since retiring from playing, Twellman has devoted himself to coaching as well as marketing soccer gear and apparel.   He runs the Twellman Soccer Academy and in 2007, he became the head coach of the Villa Duchesne/Oak Hill School in St. Louis.

References

External links
 Twellman Soccer profile
 NASL/MISL stats

1955 births
Living people
American soccer coaches
American soccer players
Chicago Sting (MISL) players
Chicago Sting (NASL) players
Kansas City Comets (original MISL) players
Major Indoor Soccer League (1978–1992) players
Minnesota Kicks players
North American Soccer League (1968–1984) indoor players
North American Soccer League (1968–1984) players
SIU Edwardsville Cougars men's soccer players
Tulsa Roughnecks (1978–1984) players
United States men's international soccer players
Association football forwards
Association football midfielders
Soccer players from St. Louis
High school soccer coaches in the United States